Louis Cohen (1863 – 16 March 1933) was a New Zealand cricketer. He played in one first-class match for Canterbury in 1890/91.

See also
 List of Canterbury representative cricketers

References

External links
 

1863 births
1933 deaths
New Zealand cricketers
Canterbury cricketers